Alan Perathoner (born 2 July 1976) is an Italian former alpine skier who competed in the 2002 Winter Olympics.

External links
 
 

1976 births
Living people
Ladin people
Italian male alpine skiers
Olympic alpine skiers of Italy
Alpine skiers at the 2002 Winter Olympics
People from Sëlva
Sportspeople from Südtirol